The Waverly Main Street Historic District is a predominantly commercial historic district on the northwestern side of Baltimore, Maryland.  This commercial nexus built up in the late 19th through mid 20th centuries as the city expanded along York Turnpike.  The district extends along Greenmount Avenue, between Exeter Hall Avenue and East 35th Street, and includes some properties on adjacent streets.

The district was listed on the National Register of Historic Places in 2013.

References

External links
, including undated photo, and boundary map at Maryland Historical Trust

Historic districts on the National Register of Historic Places in Baltimore
Neighborhoods in Baltimore
Northwest Baltimore